Lady Margaret Burnet (née Kennedy; died May, 1685) was the wife of Bishop Gilbert Burnet.

Life
Lady Margaret was the second and last daughter of John Kennedy, 6th Earl of Cassilis and his first wife, Lady Jean Hamilton, daughter of Thomas Hamilton, 1st Earl of Haddington. She was well-regarded as a political advisor. King Charles II spoke of her favourably and John Maitland, 1st Duke of Lauderdale referred to her in correspondence as "wife". Their letters were discovered and published in 1828.

She was the first wife of Gilbert Burnet, the eminent Whig historian and later Bishop of Salisbury. They married in 1672 or 1673 in secret as there was a large difference in both their ages and their wealth. He was concerned that observers might speculate that he had married Margaret primarily for her wealth. For this reason, he arranged for what is now called a prenuptial agreement where he renounced all claims to her money. It has been speculated that she married on the rebound, after she discovered that Lauderdale's first wife, Lady Anne Home, had died and that he had remarried his formidable second wife Lady Elizabeth Murray.

After the fact of her marriage became well known she moved to London and lived with Burnet. In the 1680s she lost her memory and all recall of facts and people. Margaret died at the end of May 1685.

Burnet went on to marry Mary Scott, a wealthy Dutch heiress of Scots descent, with whom he had seven children. She died in 1698. He then married Elizabeth Blake, a noted writer on religious issues, who died in 1709.

References

1685 deaths
Daughters of Scottish earls
Year of birth unknown